Aleksandar Marton may refer to:

 Sandy Marton (born 1959), Croatian singer with an Italian career
 Aleksandar Marton (politician) (born 1976), politician in Serbia